Byblis filifolia is a species of plant in the Byblidaceae family. It is endemic to Australia.

References

filifolia
Flora of the Northern Territory
Eudicots of Western Australia
Least concern flora of Australia
Taxonomy articles created by Polbot